Dr. Akhilesh Das Gupta Institute of Technology & Management, formerly known as Northern India Engineering College, is a private college located in New Delhi, India. It was established in 2003 by the Dr. Akhilesh Das Gupta Educational Society. It is affiliated to Guru Gobind Singh Indraprastha University.

References

External links 
 

Engineering colleges in Delhi
Colleges of the Guru Gobind Singh Indraprastha University
Educational institutions established in 2003
2003 establishments in Delhi